Elizabeth Ryan and Helen Wills were the defending champions, but Wills did not participate. Ryan partnered with Joan Lycett, but lost in the semifinals to Peggy Saunders and Phoebe Watson.

Watson and Saunders defeated Eileen Bennett and Ermyntrude Harvey in the final, 6–2, 6–3 to win the ladies' doubles tennis title at the 1928 Wimbledon Championships.

Seeds

  Joan Lycett /  Elizabeth Ryan (semifinals)
  Eileen Bennett /  Ermyntrude Harvey (final)
  Peggy Saunders /  Phoebe Watson (champions)
  Kea Bouman /  Evelyn Colyer (quarterfinals)

Draw

Finals

Top half

Section 1

Section 2

The nationality of Mrs Herriot is unknown.

Bottom half

Section 3

Section 4

References

External links

Women's Doubles
Wimbledon Championship by year – Women's doubles
Wimbledon Championships - Doubles
Wimbledon Championships - Doubles